Owch Tappeh-ye Gharbi Rural District is in Torkamanchay District of Mianeh County, East Azerbaijan province, Iran. At the National Census of 2006, its population was 2,690 in 535 households. There were 2,152 inhabitants in 571 households at the following census of 2011. At the most recent census of 2016, the population of the rural district was 1,735 in 537 households. The largest of its 18 villages was Qaleh Juq-e Najafqoli Khan, with 447 people.

References 

Meyaneh County

Rural Districts of East Azerbaijan Province

Populated places in East Azerbaijan Province

Populated places in Meyaneh County